The Patriarchal Congregation of Bzommar is an Armenian Catholic religious congregation of priests which was founded in 1750. They use the initials I.C.P.B. after their names.

They were established when the Patriarch of Cilicia, head of the Armenian Catholic Church, established a monastery attached to his cathedral in Bzommar, Lebanon. The men who entered formed a religious community dedicated to the service of the Church, providing spiritual support to the Armenian people. They committed themselves to going wherever in the world they might be sent by the Catholicos, who is ex officio the Superior General of the congregation.

The congregation has provided a number of bishops to the Church during its history. One example is Jean Pierre XVIII Kasparian, who was a member of the congregation, was Patriarch of Cilicia from 1982–1998.

References

External links
Official Site

1750 establishments in Europe
Armenian Catholic Church
Eastern Catholic orders and societies
Eastern Catholic priests
Religious organizations established in 1750